Deadline is the second studio album by the Mexican heavy metal band S7N, released on June 17, 2016. In 2016, the album was nominated for Best Metal/Hardcore Album on the 15th Independent Music Awards.

Production and promotion 
The band recorded the album in SMStudios in Mexico City during February and March, 2016. The album was produced by Allison's singer Erik Canales, who also participated with arrangements. The album was crowdfunded during the first trimester of 2016, allowing fans to be part of the recording sessions as a reward. Eduardo Carrillo and Manuel Vázquez, from SMStudios and Mexican progressive metal band Agora, served as audio engineers, with Vázquez also collaborating with "Innocent Guilty"'s guitar solo composition and recording.

The band's debut single "Innoncent Guilty" was released on April 29, 2016, with a lyric video via YouTube. On May 21, the band had a listening party for fans, media and friends at Mexico City, where they debuted the album. "Bomb Maker" was released as second single on June 5, 2017, with a music video directed by Lack of Remorse's singer Andrei Pulver.

Reception 

Deadline received positive reviews from music critics. Miguel H. Zetter of Rolling Stone Mexico defines the album as "Mexican metal for exportation". Poncho Civeira compares Deadlines essence with "Black Sabbath's heaviness and Metallica's power."

 Track listing 

 Personnel S7N Mao Kanto – lead vocals, rhythm guitar
 Guillermo García – lead guitar, backing vocals
 Israel Monroy – lead guitar, backing vocals
 Lalo Olvera – bass guitarAdditional musicians Leo Padua – drums
 Manuel Vázquez – guitar solo on "Innocent Guilty"Production'
 Erik Canales – producer, arrangements
 Eduardo Carrillo – engineer
 Manuel Vázquez – engineer
 Distinctive Audio – mixing, mastering
 Karla Farrugia – cover art

References

External links 

S7N at Spotify (streamed copy where licensed)

S7N albums
2016 albums